Anikó Góg (born 10 February 1980 in Orosháza, Békés) is an athlete from Hungary. She competes in triathlon. Góg competed at the first Olympic triathlon at the 2000 Summer Olympics. She took thirty-ninth place with a total time of 2:14:50.55.

References
sports-reference

1980 births
Living people
Hungarian female triathletes
Triathletes at the 2000 Summer Olympics
Olympic triathletes of Hungary
People from Orosháza
Sportspeople from Békés County